Miljølisten is a local political party set in Fanø Municipality.

History
Miljølisten has been represented in Fanø Municipality's municipal council since 1978, though not between 1994 and 1997.

In the 2013 municipal election, Miljølisten received 11.8% of the votes in Fanø Municipality, giving them two seats in the municipal council.

Election results

Municipal elections

References

Local political parties in Denmark
Green political parties in Denmark
Political parties established in 1978
1978 establishments in Denmark